Anthony Joseph Gilroy (born September 11, 1956) is an American filmmaker. He wrote the screenplays for the original Bourne trilogy (2002–2007) and wrote and directed the fourth film of the franchise, The Bourne Legacy (2012). He also wrote and directed Michael Clayton (2007) and Duplicity (2009), earning nominations for the Academy Award for Best Director and the Academy Award for Best Original Screenplay for the former.

In 2016, Gilroy was hired by Lucasfilm to provide rewrites and uncredited reshoots for Rogue One: A Star Wars Story (2016) . He later returned to the Star Wars universe as the showrunner, head writer and executive producer of Andor (2022–present), a Disney+ political spy drama series chronicling the evolution of Cassian Andor over a five-year period preceding the events of Rogue One.

Personal life
Gilroy was born in Manhattan, New York City, the son of Ruth Dorothy (née Gaydos), a sculptor and writer, and Frank D. Gilroy, an award-winning playwright, director, and movie producer, who received the Tony Award for Best Play and the Pulitzer Prize for Drama for his play The Subject Was Roses in 1965. He is the brother of screenwriter Dan Gilroy and editor John Gilroy. Through his father, he is of Italian, Irish and German descent.
He has two children, Sam and Kathryn, and is married to Susan Gilroy.

Gilroy was raised in Washingtonville, New York. He graduated from Washingtonville High School in 1974 at 16 years old and attended Boston University for two years before dropping out to concentrate on his music career.

Career

Writing
Gilroy has written many scripts for film, starting with the script for The Cutting Edge in 1992. This was followed by Dolores Claiborne in 1995 and The Devil's Advocate in 1997. He was one of five credited writers on Michael Bay's Armageddon, the highest-grossing film of 1998. Gilroy's next script was Proof of Life in 2000. In 2002, 2003 and 2007 he wrote the screenplays for The Bourne Identity, The Bourne Supremacy and The Bourne Ultimatum, and wrote and directed the next installment of the Bourne series, The Bourne Legacy (2012).

Also in 2007, he wrote and directed the film Michael Clayton, which won an Edgar Award for Best Motion Picture Screenplay, and was nominated for several Academy Awards including screenplay. In 2009, Gilroy wrote and directed the romantic comedy spy film Duplicity, starring Clive Owen, Julia Roberts and Tom Wilkinson. Gilroy was set, along with The Bourne Ultimatum co-screenwriter Scott Z. Burns, to write the script for the upcoming film Army of Two, based on the video game from EA Montreal.

In September 2013, Gilroy delivered a screenwriting lecture as part of the BAFTA and BFI Screenwriters' Lecture Series.

In 2018, he received a Distinguished Screenwriter Award from the Austin Film Festival.

Directing
Gilroy's directorial debut was in 2007, when he directed the film Michael Clayton, which his brother John Gilroy edited. The film was nominated for seven Academy Awards, including Best Picture, Best Director and Best Actor. In addition to its Edgar Award, the film won one Oscar, for Best Supporting Actress (Tilda Swinton). The film was a box office success, grossing over $92 million worldwide.

He also wrote and directed his next film, Duplicity, released March 20, 2009, and starring Clive Owen, Julia Roberts and Tom Wilkinson. He then took over as director of the next entry in the Bourne series as well as co-writing; the film, The Bourne Legacy, was released August 10, 2012, starring Jeremy Renner, Rachel Weisz, Edward Norton, Joan Allen, and Albert Finney.

Star Wars
In 2016, Gilroy co-wrote the script to the sci-fi war film Rogue One, directed by Gareth Edwards. It is a prequel to the 1977 classic Star Wars. Gilroy shared writing duties with fellow filmmaker Chris Weitz.

In October 2019, Gilroy returned to the Star Wars franchise to serve as the showrunner for the Disney+ political spy drama Andor, taking over from Stephen Schiff. Gilroy wrote five of the twelve episodes in the series' first season and was also originally set to direct multiple episodes. However, Toby Haynes took over as the director of these episodes due to COVID-19 travel restrictions. After multiple delays, Andor premiered on September 21, 2022, and received widespread critical acclaim.

Filmography

Feature films 

Uncredited writing works

Television and web

References

External links

Profile in The New Yorker (March 9, 2009)

1956 births
Film directors from New York City
American male screenwriters
Living people
Writers from Manhattan
Edgar Award winners
Boston University College of Communication alumni
Film producers from New York (state)
American people of German descent
American people of Irish descent
American writers of Italian descent
People from Washingtonville, New York
Screenwriters from New York (state)
American people of Italian descent